Alamanda was a trobairitz whose only surviving work is a tenso with Giraut de Bornelh called . In the past she was usually considered fictitious and the "tenso" was considered a piece of Giraut's writing. However, an Alamanda is mentioned by three other troubadours, including the trobairitz Lombarda, indicating that she was probably real and quite prominent in Occitan poetic circles.

Her tenso with Giraut de Bornelh mirrors in form a canso by the Comtessa de Dia.

The trobairitz is probably identical with the Alamanda de Castelnau or Castelnou who was born around 1160. She was probably poetically active only briefly while spending her youth at the court of Raymond V of Toulouse (reigned 1148-1194). She left his court to marry Guilhem de Castelnou and later became a canoness of Saint-Étienne at Toulouse, dying in 1223.

Sources

Sources
Bruckner, Matilda Tomaryn; Shepard, Laurie; and White, Sarah. Songs of the Women Troubadours. New York: Garland Publishing, 1995. . 
 M. L. Abbé Salvan,  Histoire Générale de l'église de Toulouse: Depuis les temps les plus recalés jusqu'à nos jours (Toulouse, 1859) (external link to Internet Archive text)

1160s births
1223 deaths
Trobairitz
Year of birth uncertain
12th-century French troubadours
12th-century French women writers
13th-century French women